Robert Spade (1877-1924) was a Major League Baseball pitcher. He played four seasons in the major leagues, from  until , for the Cincinnati Reds and St. Louis Browns.

When Spade died in 1924 he was penniless, and fans raised the money to pay for his burial.

Notes

Sources

Major League Baseball pitchers
Cincinnati Reds players
St. Louis Browns players
Youngstown Puddlers players
Macon Brigands players
Akron Rubbernecks players
Atlanta Crackers players
Newark Indians players
Baseball players from Ohio
1877 births
1924 deaths